Sanam is a 1997 Hindi language romantic drama action film directed and produced by Aziz Sejawal. Written by Anees Bazmee, it starred Sanjay Dutt, Manisha Koirala, Vivek Mushran, Anupam Kher, Dalip Tahil, Kader Khan, Anjan Srivastav, Gulshan Grover and Shakti Kapoor. The music, composed by Anand–Milind, was the biggest strength of this film. The movie did average business at the box office.

Plot 
Gaurav (Vivek Mushran) lives a wealthy lifestyle, gets everything he wants except the love of his parents and family. Even though he lives with his parents, they love his elder brother Narendra (Sanjay Dutt) more. Narendra is often pronounced by the name of "Hero" by his parents, and goes abroad for his job once a while. When Hero comes back home for a holiday, he goes to a funfair with his family, and witnesses a little girl who is stuck on top of a Ferris wheel, and when Hero gets the chance, he climbs up and rescues her. By the time he jumps off, it is already on fire, which causes it to explode, and blows Hero off with it as well. The whole family is devastated by Hero's death, and since he was the only one who made a name for his family, Gaurav finally feals pity and joins the army to prove to his father that he is worthy to be the Hero's younger brother. While on duty, Gaurav discovers that Angara and General (Shakti Kapoor, Gulshan Grover) are about to plant bombs through the whole of India, and that would just not mean for his parents and friends to die, but also his loving girlfriend, Sanam (Manisha Koirala).

Cast
Manisha Koirala as Sanam 
Sanjay Dutt as Narendra Anand / Hero (special appearance)
Vivek Mushran as Gaurav Anand
Shakti Kapoor as Angara
Anupam Kher as Seth Yashpal Anand, Gaurav's and Narendra Hero's father
Kader Khan as Khan Bahadur 
Aanjjan Srivastav as Margat Lal
Gulshan Grover as General
Asrani as Police Inspector
Maya Alagh as Mrs. Meeta Anand, Gaurav's and Narendra Hero's mother
Razak Khan as Man with broken leg
Dalip Tahil as Coach
Harish Patel as Balwant Sinha
Usha Nadkarni
MD Rakibul Islam as Rakibul
Rami Reddy as Shera
Arun Bakshi as Constable Questing Khan about his vehicle
Ishrat Ali as Lala, Khan's Landlord
Harbans Darshan M.Arora as Lalaji Grocer
Birbal as Traffic Constable
Sulabha Deshpande
Dinesh Hingoo as Office Clerk
Viju Khote as Palmist
Manmauji as Shamsher Singh
Achyut Potdar as Datta Leader
Javed Rizvi as Servant boy
G.P. Singh as Politician
Manav Kaul as Militaty Officer
Surendra Rahi as Police Officer

Controversy
The film was in news because of Dutt's involvement in the 1993 Bombay Bombings.During his statement he said that while he was shooting for the film producers Hanif and Samir arranged the gun from gangster Abu Salem. As a result, Dutt distanced himself from the film and its delayed release.

Soundtrack
The music was composed by Anand–Milind, with lyrics by Sameer. The soundtrack for this film was released back in 1993. The songs "Ankhon Mein Neende Na Dil" and "Ishq Mein Mere Rabba" were very popular and featured in Cibaca Geet Mala 1993.

References

External links
 Sanam at the Bollywood Hungama
 

1997 films
1990s Hindi-language films
Films scored by Anand–Milind
Films directed by Aziz Sejawal